Kamuning station (also called GMA–Kamuning station) is an elevated Manila Metro Rail Transit (MRT) station situated on Line 3. The station is located at the barangay boundary of South Triangle and Pinyahan in the Scout Area of Diliman in Quezon City and is named after the nearby barangay of Kamuning and the road named after the barangay.

The station is the third station for trains headed towards Taft Avenue and the eleventh for trains headed towards North Avenue.

Nearby landmarks
The station is near Timog Avenue, known for being an entertainment district of Quezon City, as well as the GMA Network Center, Manuel L. Quezon University, Victoria Sports Tower, Anchor Tower, and Department of Public Works and Highways – Quezon City 2nd District Engineering Office. It is near Quezon City's Diliman area, where the Public-Private Partnership Center, Land Transportation Office, Philippine Statistics Authority, Philippine Heart Center, and Quezon City Hall in Triangle Park are accessible via East Avenue, along with the Quezon Memorial Circle.

Gallery

See also

List of rail transit stations in Metro Manila
Manila Metro Rail Transit System Line 3

Manila Metro Rail Transit System stations
Railway stations opened in 1999
Buildings and structures in Quezon City
1999 establishments in the Philippines